Miantonomoh (1600? – August 1643), also spelled Miantonomo, Miantonomah or Miantonomi, was a chief of the Narragansett people of New England Indians.

Biography
He was a nephew of the Narragansett grand sachem, Canonicus (died 1647), with whom he associated in the government of the tribe, and whom he succeeded in 1636. Miantonomoh seems to have been friendly to the English colonists of Massachusetts, Rhode Island, and Connecticut, though he was accused of being treacherous. In 1632 Miantonomoh and his wife Wawaloam travelled to Boston to visit with Governor John Winthrop.

In 1636, when under suspicion, Miantonomoh went to Boston to prove his loyalty to the colonists and deny alligations of infedelity. In the following year, during the Pequot War, he permitted John Mason to lead his Connecticut expedition against the Pequot Indians through Narragansett country. The Pequot were defeated in this war. In 1638, he signed for the Narragansett the tripartite treaty between that tribe, the Connecticut colonists and the Mohegan Indians, which provided for a perpetual peace between the parties, and Miantonomoh was given control over eighty of the two hundred Pequot. However, conflict continued with the Mohegans over control of the Pequot people and land. Miantonomoh tried to organize other tribes throughout the New England region in a union against the colonists.

The conflict with the Mohegans turned into a war in 1643. Miantonomoh invaded Mohegan territory with nearly 1,000 warriors, but was defeated. Miantonomoh was slowed by his coat of heavy armor and was taken prisoner. Miantonomoh suggested an alliance against the colonists to the sachem of the Mohegans, Uncas, but instead, Uncas brought him to Hartford to seek advice concerning further action from the Colonial Commissioners at their first meeting.

The commissioners of the United Colonies of New England, not knowing what to do, asked a committee of five clergymen from Boston, to whom his case was referred. Although Miantonomoh had made war with their consent, albeit from Gov. John Winthrop of the Massachusetts Bay colony who knew not much of the issues concerning the two Sachems, they suggested that he should be killed while admitting they had no authority to do so. Miantonomoh was taken back to Norwich, where he had been defeated, and killed with a tomahawk by Wawequa, the brother of Uncas.

Family
His younger brother Pessicus and Miantonomoh's son Canonchet were Narragansett sachems.  A daughter or granddaughter, Minnetinka, was raised and educated by a Dutch family after her mother died and her father Miantonomoh was killed by the Mohegans.  She married John Corey with her Christian name being Elizabeth Gasesett.

Ancestry

Legacy
Inducted into the Rhode Island Heritage Hall of Fame in 1997
Four ships in the United States Navy have been named for him, two as Miantonomoh and two as Miantonomah.
There is a monument to Miantonomo in Sachem's Park, Norwich, Connecticut.
Miantonomi Memorial Park in Newport, Rhode Island
A street named after him and his uncle, Canonicus, in bordering Middletown, Rhode Island.

See also 
 List of early settlers of Rhode Island

Notes

References

1600s births
1643 deaths
1643 crimes
Native American leaders
Executed Native American people
Narragansett people
People of colonial Rhode Island
17th-century Native Americans
17th-century executions of American people